Riegel v. Medtronic, Inc., 552 U.S. 312 (2008), is a United States Supreme Court case in which the Court held that the pre-emption clause of the Medical Device Amendment bars state common-law claims that challenge the effectiveness or safety of a medical device marketed in a form that received premarket approval from the Food and Drug Administration.

It modified the rule in Medtronic, Inc. v. Lohr.

See also 
 Eli Lilly & Co. v. Medtronic, Inc.
 FDA Preemption
 List of United States Supreme Court cases, volume 552

References

Further reading

External links
 

United States Supreme Court cases
United States Supreme Court cases of the Roberts Court
United States federal preemption law
Medtronic litigation